Platydesmida (Greek for platy "flat" and desmos "bond") is an order of millipedes containing two families and over 60 species. Some species practice paternal care, in which males guard the eggs.

Description
Platydesmidans have a flattened body shape with lateral extensions (paranota) on each segment. They lack eyes, and have between 30 and 110 body segments.

Behavior

While most millipedes feed on dead or decomposing leaf litter platydesmidans may be specialized to feed on fungi. Platydesmidans have also been studied with regard to parental investment, in that males of some species coil around eggs and young, a rare example of paternal care in arthropods. This behavior has been observed in species of   Brachycybe from North America and Japan, and Yamasinaium from Japan, all are in the family Andrognathidae.

Evolutionary history 
The only described fossil of the order is from the Mid Cretaceous (~100 Ma) Burmese amber, belonging to the extant genus Andrognathus, several undescribed specimens belonging to the order are known from the same deposit.

Distribution
Platydesmidans occur in North America, Central America, the Mediterranean region of Europe, Japan, China, southeast Asia and Indonesia.

Classification

The order contains two families.

Family Andrognathidae Cope, 1869
Andrognathus 
Bazillozonium  
Brachycybe  
Corcyrozonium  
Dolistenus  
Fioria  
Gosodesmus  
Ischnocybe  
Mitocybe  
Pseudodesmus  
Sumatronium  
Symphyopleurium  
Trichozonium  
Yamasinaium  
Zinaceps  
Zinazonium

Family Platydesmidae DeSaussure, 1860
Desmethus 
Platydesmus

References

Further reading

External links

 
Millipede orders